is a Japanese actor and singer. His major works include lead roles as Wataru Kurenai in Kamen Rider Kiva; and supporting roles as Satoru Okura in Atashinchi no Danshi, Ariake Yamato in Otomen, and Eiji Kikumaru in Tenimyu. He stars as Mori Ranmaru in the drama, Gō: Hime-tachi no Sengoku.

In 2010, he was named one of the most promising actors and actresses, placing 7th in a poll conducted by Oricon. Through his role with Kamen Rider Kiva, he was also the lead vocalist of the J-Rock band Tetra-Fang. Seto is a member of D-Boys.

Life and career 
Born in 1988 in Kyushu, Kōji Seto grew up as the oldest child with two younger sisters. His childhood dream of becoming a vet changed suddenly with the end of his Junior High School time, when he watched with 15 years the TV series Orange Days. The praised drama and performance by Satoshi Tsumabuki inspired his wish to become an actor. After discussing his plans with his parents, they decided to support their son and enrolled him to a local acting school.

After one year in training, he was cast in 2005 as Makoto Kanno, the snobbish main antagonist  the comedy TV Series Rocket Boys. Although the series was filmed earlier, it would take over six months until its broadcasting. Meanwhile, after the filming ended, his parents surprised their son with a letter that stated the teenager made it to the final round of Watanabe Entertainment's 2nd official D-Boys audition. With his interpretation of Fukuyama Masaharu's song "Himawari" won Seto the Grand Prix 2nd Winner Award on July 31, 2005. He debuted as a Junior member just shortly afterwards in December at the 3rd D-Live Event - an entertainment show featuring only D-Boys members.

In spring 2006, at the age of 17, he finally moved after constant commuting from his rural and idyllic hometown in Fukuoka to live by himself in Tokyo. Seto starred together with all his fellow D-Boys members in their first own TV production "DD-Boys" and won, at the same time, the audition for the part of the hyperactive acrobatic tennis player Eiji Kikumaru in Tenimyu. In 151 performances the name Setomaru was established (the nickname was his own idea, by combining his own surname (Seto) and Eiji's (Maru)) and took its place in the hearts of fans in Japan and all over the world until his graduation alongside the members of the 3rd Seigaku-Generation on September 9, 2007. He and his stage partner Yukihiro Takiguchi were honored with a Best Actors Album and praised by the creator of the original work Takeshi Konomi as perfect cast.

Seto's official D-Boys logo is a chameleon, in reference to his versatility. In late 2006 the young actor was chosen as Thursday's-face of OhaStar, a children's TV show airing live every morning on TV Tokyo. He co-hosted the show constantly from then, once a week together with Kōichi Yamadera, until his graduation on April 28, 2008. Seto was not just a boy in an old-fashioned green uniform - he also had the ability to change his persona with the use of his "Miracle Glasses". This way, he was able to act out his part in eight different ways. He starred in his first leading part in spring 2007, as the dallying greenhorn Kyoichi Segawa, a young gentleman Butler in Happy Boys. The drama followed Makoto Tateno's script, which was published alongside the TV series in Manga-form. Manga artist Tateno created the character design originally based upon the actors - a very rare occurrence. Right after this series, the teenager was offered his first starring role in a movie, as the meekly salesman Tibe-kun, who tries to deal with the yaoi passion of his girlfriend in the comedy Tonari no Yaoi-chan, a self-parody movie based on a real-life blog that centered on the 801-chan phenomenon.

The part of Izamu Hayama in the feature film Tenshi ga Kureta Mono was his first cinema production in autumn 2007. He then co-starred in winter 2007 with Aya Ueto and Yo Oizumi in his first Golden Time TV series Abarenbo Mama as a kindergarten teacher. From January 2008 to 2009 he starred as one of Toei's Tokusatsu Heros, the young violinist and half-vampire Wataru Kurenai, the protagonist in Kamen Rider Kiva. About the same time, was Seto chosen among 1000 competitors in an audition for the leading part as the rebel Hiroki "Hiro" Sakurai, in the TV series adaption of Koizora (after the bestseller book by Mika), making him the leading actor for two TV series filmed and broadcast at the same time. Both works earned him a nomination for the renowned Elan d'Or award as Best Newcomer of the Year 2009.

In early 2009, Seto started filming for the latest Ju-On movie Ju-On - Black Girl. He reprised his role as Wataru Kurenai for the first and last episode of Kamen Rider Decade, as well as in Decade: Last Story, the last part of the storyline, as a guest star. Afterwards, he starred as the hotheaded genius-magician Satoru Okura in the Fuji TV drama Atashinchi no Danshi as one of Maki Horikita's six sons, followed by his part as the cheerful, but delusional junior Ariake Yamato in the drama adaption of the Hit-Manga Otomen in Summer. At the end of October, he finished filming with Yusuke Yamamoto for their roles as brothers (having previously starred as brothers in Atashinchi no Danshi) in the award-winning TV movie Rinne no Ame, in which Seto portrayed the mentally disabled, autistic Shuhei Mikami.

In early 2010, he played Shunta Matsumoto, a young medical student in the BeeTV drama Gift, a part that was written for him, as an alternative version of himself. In the spring TBS TV series Tumbling, Seto is starring as Yuta Takenaka, captain to the boy's rhythmic gymnastics team at Karasumori High, alongside Yusuke Yamamoto again. For the 10th anniversary commemoration of Watanabe Entertainment, he was selected with fellow D-Boys members Shunji Igarashi, Yuichi Nakamura, and Hirofumi Araki to represent all members of the group in a special unit with a new fifth member determined through the 2010 D-Boys Audition. Recently, he's been filming and played as Mori Ranmaru for the latest Taiga drama Gō for 2011.

On 7 August 2020, Seto married his costar in TV dramas Hope: Kitai Zero no Shinnyu Shain and Perfect World, Mizuki Yamamoto.

Filmography

Film

Television

Discography

Official photobooks

Official DVDs

Awards

See also
 The Prince of Tennis

References

External links
Koji Seto's Blog 
Koji Seto's D-Boys Profile 

1988 births
Living people
Japanese male actors
People from Kama, Fukuoka
People from Fukuoka
Musicians from Fukuoka Prefecture
Watanabe Entertainment
21st-century Japanese singers
21st-century Japanese male singers